This is a list of International Emmy Awards ceremonies, the years which they were honoring, their hosts, and their ceremony dates.

See also 
 List of International Emmy Award winners

References

External links

International Emmy Awards ceremonies
Ceremonies
International Emmy Awards
Emmy